To help compare different orders of magnitude, the following list describes various voltage levels.

SI multiple

Notes

External links

Voltage
Voltage